Doratodon is an extinct genus of Late Cretaceous ziphodont crocodylomorph that was once believed to be a dinosaur, that could be a sebecosuchian mesoeucrocodylian. Two species of Doratodon are known to science: D. carcharidens from Austria (Grünbach Formation) and Hungary (Csehbánya Formation), the type species; and D. ibericus from Spain (Sierra Perenchiza Formation).

The holotype of D. carcharidens consists of a denture and a mandible. Other specimens include a maxilla fragment, a parietal and teeth. The holotype, and only known specimen of D. ibericus, consists of an incomplete left mandible with dentation.

History
In 1859, geologist Eduard Suess at the Gute Hoffnung coal mine at Muthmannsdorf near Wiener Neustadt in Austria, discovered the holotype, PIUW 2349/57. With the help of mine intendant Pawlowitsch, they attempted to find the source of the fossil material. The search proved fruitless at first but ultimately a thin marl layer was discovered, intersected by an obliquely sloping mine shaft, which contained an abundant number of various archosaur fossils. These were subsequently excavated by Suess and Ferdinand Stoliczka. The marl was a fresh water deposit, now considered part of the Grünbach Formation.

Emanuel Bunzel named the type specimen as Crocodilus carcharidens in 1871. He believed it to belong to a dinosaur. It was renamed as the new species Doratodon carcharidens in 1881 by Harry Govier Seeley. The second species, D. ibericus, was named by Company et al. in 2005. Doratodon was reassessed by Zoltan et al. (2015) and Rabi & Sebok (2015) as a possible sebecosuchian mesoeucrocodylian.

Description
Doratodon is represented by its diagnostic triangular, labiolingually flattened, and mesially and distally finely serrated teeth as well as some fragmentary dentaries.

Classification
Doratodon was initially identified as a theropod dinosaur, but it was later placed within the Ziphosuchia. Zoltan et al. (2015) and Rabi & Sebok (2015) placed Doratodon within Sebecosuchia, a clade within Ziphosuchia.

Palaeobiology

Palaeoecology

Doratodon is known from at least three formations in Europe: the Grünbach Formation, the Csehbánya Formation and the Sierra Perenchiza Formation.

In the Grünbach Formation, Doratodon would have coexisted with: three species of indeterminate pterosaurs (one is Ornithocheirus buenzeli), an unnamed eusuchian, an unnamed choristodere, two indeterminate turtle species, an indeterminate tetanuran theropod, the rhabdodontid Mochlodon and the nodosaurids Rhadinosaurus and Struthiosaurus. 

In the Csehbánya Formation, Doratodon would have coexisted with: multiple species of squamates, such as the mosasaur Pannoniasaurus and the scincomorph Chromatogenys, three species of crocodyliformes (cf. Allodaposuchus, Iharkutosuchus and cf. Theriosuchus), three species of turtles (Foxemys, Kallokibotion and Dortokidae indet.), the pterosaurs Bakonydraco, Azhdarchidae indet. and Pterodactyloidea indet., and the dinosaurs Ajkaceratops, Bauxitornis, Hungarosaurus, Mochlodon, Pneumatoraptor, Struthiosaurus, Paraves indet., Abelisauridae indet., Tetanurae indet. and an indeterminate sauropod.

In the Sierra Perenchiza Formation, Doratodon would have coexisted with: the crocodyliformes Acynodon and Musturzabalsuchus, indeterminate turtles, an indeterminate lissamphibian, two indeterminate frog species (one species likely part of the Discoglossidae), indeterminate pterosaurs an indeterminate albanerpetontid and several indeterminate dinosaurs.

Paleobiogeography 
Bergisuchus and Iberosuchus do not appear to be closely related to the Cretaceous sebecosuchian Doratodon, which was found across Europe during the Late Cretaceous. This appears to indicate that Bergisuchus and other European sebecosuchians did not descend from Cretaceous European sebecosuchians like Doratodon, but was instead part of a separate invasion of sebecosuchians into Europe during the Palaeogene from South America.

References

Late Cretaceous crocodylomorphs of Europe
Prehistoric life of Europe
Prehistoric pseudosuchian genera
Fossils of Austria
Fossil taxa described in 1881
Taxa named by Harry Seeley